
Year 107 BC was a year of the pre-Julian Roman calendar. At the time it was known as the Year of the Consulship of Ravilla and Marius (or, less frequently, year 647 Ab urbe condita) and the Fourth Year of Yuanfeng. The denomination 107 BC for this year has been used since the early medieval period, when the Anno Domini calendar era became the prevalent method in Europe for naming years.

Events 
 By place 

 Crimea 
 The uprising of Saumachus against Mithridates VI in the Bosporan Kingdom.

 Roman Republic 
 Gaius Marius, having enacted the Marian reforms of the Roman army, arrives in North Africa to lead the war against Jugurtha, with a young quaestor named Lucius Cornelius Sulla as a subordinate.
In the course of the migration of the Cimbrians and Teutons, a Germanic-Celtic confederation including the Helvetic tribes of the Tigurinians and Tougenians, under the leadership of Divico, ambush and defeat the Roman legions under Lucius Cassius Longinus, Lucius Caesoninus and Gaius Popillius Laenas at the Battle of Burdigala on the Garonne. As a result, the town of Tolosa, populated by the Volcae, revolts against the Roman Empire.

Births

Deaths

References